Casaluce is a comune (municipality) in the Province of Caserta in the Italian region Campania, located about  north of Naples and about  southwest of Caserta.

Casaluce borders the following municipalities: Aversa, Frignano, San Tammaro, Santa Maria Capua Vetere, Teverola.

History
Most likely Casaluce originated on the ruins of late Roman imperial ruins, a village being mentioned in the Cronaca Volturnese of 964 AD. In the early 11th century the first Normans immigrants had a base here. A castle was built by them in the place, in 1030 by Robert Guiscard, or 1060, by Rainulf Drengot, depending from the sources. The castle was destroyed by Roger II of Sicily after his victory against Drengot's successor, Richard II of Aversa. Roger later allowed a reconstruction of the structure, which was used as a military and tax-collection outpost under  the Hohenstaufen dynasty, as a fief of the Casaluccia family. Later it was a possession of the del Balzo.

In 1360 the Celestine monks acquired the castle, adding a Gothic church annexed to it which became a centre of veneration of an image of the Virgin.

References

External links
Sanctuary of Casaluce 

Cities and towns in Campania
Castles in Italy
Benedictine monasteries in Italy
Monasteries in Campania